Fåker is a village situated in Östersund Municipality, Jämtland County, Sweden with 209 inhabitants in 2005.

References 

Populated places in Östersund Municipality
Jämtland